Ty-asch, Mamhilad, Monmouthshire is a farmhouse dating from the late 16th century. Largely unaltered since its construction, Ty-asch is a Grade II* listed building.

History and description
The farmhouse dates from the late 16th century and is constructed to a two-cell plan. By 1650, a bakehouse had been built adjacent to the main structure. In the 19th century, the windows were replaced with Victorian casements. The farmhouse of a working farm until the 1930s, at which point it was put to use as a cow shelter. It was then unaltered until converted back to residential use in the 21st century. It remains a private home. The house is not mentioned in John Newman's Gwent/Monmouthshire Pevsner, its listing in 2001 post-dating the publication. A Grade II* listed building, the Cadw record describes Ty-asch as "extraordinarily unaltered".

Notes

External links
Illustrated sales particulars

Grade II* listed buildings in Monmouthshire
Country houses in Wales
Grade II* listed houses